Petre Constantin Buchwald (21 May 1937 – 16 December 2022) was a Romanian politician. A member of the Democratic Alliance of Hungarians in Romania, he served in the Senate from 1992 to 1996.

Buchwald died on 16 December 2022, at the age of 85.

References

1937 births
2022 deaths
20th-century Romanian politicians
Members of the Senate of Romania
Democratic Union of Hungarians in Romania politicians
Babeș-Bolyai University alumni
Politicians from Cluj-Napoca